Zavala, also known as Quissico, is a city in Mozambique.  It is the capital of the  Zavala District.

The town lies on the Mozambique Channel coast and the EN1 road.  It is known for its lagoons and for its musicianship.

The Chopi ethnic group is numerous in Zavala.  Famous people from Zavala include Alexandre José Maria dos Santos, a Cardinal who was Archbishop of Maputo; the artist Kester and Venancio Mbande.

References

See also
Chopi

Populated places in Inhambane Province